Diurnea is a genus of moths of the subfamily Chimabachinae. The genus is noted for sexual dimorphism, with the males fully winged and the females having reduced wings and incapable of flight. The larvae are polyphagous i.e. feeding on many plants, in this case deciduous shrubs and trees.

Species
The genus consists of the following species:
 Diurnea fagella (Denis & Schiffermüller, 1775)
 Diurnea lipsiella (Denis & Schiffermüller, 1775)

References

External links
 

Lypusidae